John Hogg (25 August 1879–unknown) was a Scottish footballer who played in the Football League for Middlesbrough.

References

1879 births
Association football forwards
English Football League players
Heart of Midlothian F.C. players
Luton Town F.C. players
Middlesbrough F.C. players
Scottish footballers
Year of death missing